Jaroslav Lyčka (born October 7, 1951 in Ostrava, Czechoslovakia) is a Czech former professional ice hockey player. Having started as a footballer with Dukla Prague, Lyčka switched to ice hockey. He made eight appearances for the Czechoslovakia all-stars (guest team in the North American World Hockey Association) and scored in the final of the Spengler Cup against HC Spartak Moscow, helping HC Dukla Jihlava to the title. Having moved to the UK, he was a popular defenceman for the Dundee Rockets and Lee Valley Lions.

References

Sources
 
  Lee Valley Lions nostalgia page

1951 births
Czech ice hockey defencemen
Dundee Rockets players
HC Dukla Jihlava players
HC Sparta Praha players
HC Vítkovice players
Sportspeople from Ostrava
Living people
Expatriate ice hockey players in Scotland
Expatriate ice hockey players in England
Czechoslovak expatriate ice hockey people
Czechoslovak ice hockey defencemen
Czechoslovak expatriate sportspeople in Scotland
Czechoslovak expatriate sportspeople in England
Czechoslovakia (WHA) players